Bill Cannon (born 4 April 1956 in Australia) is a former Australian rules footballer who played with St Kilda in the Victorian Football League (VFL). Two sons, who both played for Old Brighton in the Victoria Amateur Football Association.

Notes

External links 

Living people
1956 births
Australian rules footballers from Victoria (Australia)
St Kilda Football Club players
People educated at Brighton Grammar School